Schinzel–Giedion syndrome (SGS) is a congenital neurodegenerative terminal syndrome. It was first described in 1978 by Albert Schinzel (1944–) and Andreas Giedion (1925–) as a syndrome with severe midface retraction, skull anomalies, renal anomalies (hydronephrosis) and other anomalies. Babies born with Schinzel–Giedion syndrome have severe mental retardation, growth retardation (unless fed through a feeding tube) and global developmental delay.

Diagnosis 

Genetic testing for mutations in SETBP1 gene can confirm a diagnosis.

Symptoms 

Patients with this can have hydronephrosis, seizures, visual impairments, or alacrima.

Sleep apnea may also be present,

Prognosis 
Most children with condition die before 2 years of age. With it being estimated that 50% will die before 2 years of age. Death during infancy is due to pneumonia, cardiac arrest, tumors, lung hypoplasia, or seizures. 

The longest documented survivor is 15 years old. Children with this condition who survive past infancy have a higher risk of developing tumors.

Causes 
According to National Organization for Rare Disorders, the disorder is not inherited from the parents. It is caused by a new spontaneous mutation of the SETBP1 gene. The SETBP1 gene is a cancer promoting gene, and affected children who survive past three years of age are at risk for different types of cancer.

Epidemiology 
The exact prevalence of Schinzel-Giedion syndrome is unknown. But, about 50 to 80 cases have been reported in literature. Although the occurrence of this disorder is thought to be higher.

According to Orphanet, the condition occurs in 1 in 1 million people.

The condition affects both males and females equally.

See also
 SETBP1

References

External links 

 OMIM entry on Schinzel–Giedion midface retraction syndrome

Nucleus diseases
Syndromes with intellectual disability